Dega may refer to:


Geography

 Dega, Burkina Faso
 Dega (woreda), Ethiopia
 Dega, Lorestan, Iran
 Dega, Zanjan, Iran

People
 Dega (footballer) (born 1974), Brazilian footballer
 Louis Dega, fictional French criminal
 Wiktor Dega (1896–1995), Polish surgeon
 Dega Deva Kumar Reddy (born 1958), educationist and entrepreneur

Other uses
 Dega (film), a 2014 Telugu-language film
 Deutsche Gesellschaft für Akustik (DEGA), German society for acoustics
 Talladega Superspeedway, a motorsports complex in Talladega, Alabama

See also
 Degas (disambiguation)
 Deigo